Timothy  (c. 1844 – 3 April 2004) was a  Mediterranean spur-thighed tortoise, estimated to be about 160 years old at the time of her death. This made her the UK's oldest known resident. In spite of her name, Timothy was female; how to sex tortoises was not properly known in the 19th century. Timothy was named after a tortoise owned by Gilbert White.

Timothy was believed to have been born in the Mediterranean shores of the Ottoman Empire (modern-day Turkey) and was found aboard a Portuguese privateer in 1854, aged around 10, by Captain John Guy Courtenay-Everard of the Royal Navy. The tortoise served as a mascot on a series of navy vessels until 1892.

After her naval service, she retired to live out her life on dry land, taken in by the Earl of Devon at his home, Powderham Castle. From 1935, she lived in the castle's rose garden and was owned by Camilla Gabrielle Courtenay (1913–2010), the daughter of the 16th Earl of Devon. On her underside was etched "Where have I fallen? What have I done?", English translation of the Courtenay family motto ubi lapsus, quid feci.

In 1926, Timothy's owners decided that he should mate, and then  "he" was discovered to be actually female. Despite this information, mating attempts were unsuccessful.

Timothy is buried at Powderham Castle.

See also 
 Jonathan (tortoise), the oldest known living reptile  (aged )
 Lin Wang, Indian elephant who died on 26 February 2003 (aged 85)

References

External links 
 

1844 animal births
2004 animal deaths
Individual tortoises
Animal mascots
Military animals
English mascots
Individual animals in England
History of the Royal Navy
Military animals of World War I